Sten Christensen (born 18 December 1965) is a Danish former professional footballer who played as a goalkeeper.

Club career
In 1992, Christensen joined Brøndby. Christensen made his debut for the club on 16 August 1992 in a 3–3 Superligaen draw against Frem. During his time at Brøndby, Christensen would make three more Superligaen appearances for the club, primarily serving as a deputy to Mogens Krogh. Christensen would later join Hvidovre, making 15 league appearances in the 1996–97 Danish Superliga season, following Hvidovre's promotion to the top flight.

Coaching career
In 2008, Christensen returned to Brøndby as a goalkeeping coach.

In July 2012, English club Chelsea recruited Christensen as a scout, whilst he was still employed at Brøndby. A subsequent 2018 investigation by Football Leaks and Danish newspaper Politiken revealed there was no evidence Christensen performed any scouting duties whilst employed at the club on an £11,400 per month salary. Christensen left Brøndby at the end of 2018.

Personal life
Christensen's son, Andreas, is a current international footballer for Denmark.

References

1965 births
Living people
Danish men's footballers
Association football goalkeepers
Danish Superliga players
Brøndby IF players
Hvidovre IF players
Brøndby IF non-playing staff
Chelsea F.C. non-playing staff
Association football goalkeeping coaches
Association football scouts